Ost-West Handelsbank AG was a Soviet-controlled bank in Frankfurt established in 1971. It was acquired by VTB Bank and changed its name to VTB Bank Deutschland.

History
Ost-West Handelsbank AG (OWHB) was founded in 1971 by the Soviet Union's Gosbank, VEB of the USSR and a number of allied trade associations with Andrey Dubonosov as chairman of the board.

Ost-West Handelsbank supported trading between West Germany and the West with the Soviet Union and its friendly socialist states including East Germany, and, after the reunification of Germany, it continued supporting trade between Germany and the CIS states. From 1973 to 1991, OWHB facilitated trade between East Germany and West Germany through its stand at the annual spring and autumn festivals in Leipzig.

In 1974, OWHB gained stakes in Moscow People's Bank (London) and Wozkhod Handelsbank (Zurich) and Viktor Gerashchenko became the second chairman of the board replacing Dubonosov.

On 9 May 1976, Igor Semyonovich Gorbatsevich from Vneshtorgbank became chairman of the board of OWHB and Gerashchenko transferred to the Singapore branch of the Moscow Narodny Bank.

In 1983, OWHB opened its Moscow branch at Kamergersky Lane, 6.

From July to December 1985, Anatoly Tsemyansky replaced Gorbatsevich, who retired, and in February 1986 Valery Lyulchev became chairman of the board until November 1989 when Sergei Bochkarev replaced him. Bochkaryov was chairman of the board of OWHB from 1989 to 1993.

By 1990, it was the third largest of the daughters of the State Bank of USSR behind the much larger Moscow Narodny Bank in London and Banque Commerciale pour l'Europe du Nord – Eurobank in Paris.

At the end of 1991, Ost-West Handelsbank had a DM 65 million paid-in share of capital.

In the early 1990s, Sergei Nikolaevich Dergachev became president of Ost-West Handelsbank after the former president and chairman of the board of Ost-West Handelsbank from 1985 to December 1993 Sergei Mikhailovich Bochkarev left for work with the German branch of Inkombank.

See also
 Foreign trade of the Soviet Union

Notes

References

Banks of Germany
Banks of the Soviet Union
Germany–Soviet Union relations
1971 establishments in West Germany